Ymamnazar (also Ymam Nazar, Imamnazar) is a remote settlement in Turkmenistan's Lebap province. It is situated immediately adjacent to Turkmenistan's southern border with Afghanistan, opposite to Aqina. The nearest city in Turkmenistan is Kerki.

In 2007, an international border crossing point was opened in Ymamnazar, making it one of two international border crossings on the Turkmenistan-Afghanistan border, the other being Serhetabat-Torghundi. The border crossing is officially called "Saparmurat", after Saparmurat "Turkmenbashy" Niyazov, the first president of Turkmenistan.

There are basic transshipment facilities here, including a small oil terminal for shipping Turkmen hydrocarbons onward into Afghanistan.

Railhead 

In 2015, Ymamnazar became the southern terminus of a railway line from Kerki. In 2016 the line was extended across the border into Afghanistan to Aqina and opened for traffic in November 2016. It is one of only three railways in Afghanistan. The line is eventually planned to form part of railway corridor through northern Afghanistan, linking Turkmenistan with Tajikistan via Sheberghan, Mazar-i-Sharif and Sher Khan Bandar.

Petroleum Depot
As of November 2016 Ymamnazar featured a petroleum depot with 45,000 m3 capacity. The depot is designed for delivery of fuel to Afghanistan, and includes 12 storage tanks for motor fuels and liquid petroleum gas, including seven tanks of 5,000 m3 each and five tanks of 2,000 m3 each. Design capacity of the depot is 540,000 tonnes per year. Fuel is delivered to the petroleum depot by rail and by a pipeline from the Seýdi oil refinery.

See also 
 Kerki
 Rail transport in Turkmenistan
 Serhetabat

References 

Populated places in Lebap Region
Afghanistan–Turkmenistan border crossings